Dyella japonica is a Gram-negative, aerobic and rod-shaped bacterium from the genus of Dyella which has been isolated from soil from a garden in Tokyo in Japan.

References

Xanthomonadales
Bacteria described in 2005